= Paucimorphism =

A paucimorphism is a genetic sequence variant with a allele frequency of 0.0005<q<0.05.
